Barvikha is a rural locality (a settlement) in Odintsovsky District of Moscow Oblast, Russia. Population:  

The settlement was built by General Kazakov in the 19th century as a resort place to increase the profitability of his estate.

References

Rural localities in Moscow Oblast
Odintsovsky District